The 2021–22 Charlotte 49ers women's basketball team represented the University of North Carolina at Charlotte during the 2021–22 NCAA Division I women's basketball season. The team is led by eleventh-year head coach Cara Consuegra, and played their home games at the Dale F. Halton Arena in Charlotte, North Carolina as a member of Conference USA.

Schedule and results

|-
!colspan=12 style=|Non-conference regular season

|-
!colspan=12 style=|C-USA regular season

|-
!colspan=9 style=| Conference USA Tournament

|-
!colspan=9 style=| NCAA tournament

See also
 2021–22 Charlotte 49ers men's basketball team

Notes

References

Charlotte 49ers women's basketball seasons
Charlotte 49ers
Charlotte
Charlotte 49ers women's basketball
Charlotte 49ers women's basketball